Lost Ark is a 2019 MMO action role-playing game co-developed by Tripod Studio and Smilegate. It was released in South Korea in December 2019 by Smilegate and in Europe, North America, and South America in February 2022 by Amazon Games. Lost Ark cost around 85 million to develop. The game received generally favorable reviews and is among the most-played games on Steam.

Gameplay 

Lost Ark is primarily focused on player versus environment (PvE) and exploration (questing, achievement/collectible hunting, crafting, etc.). It features player versus player (PvP) elements as well. Players start by customizing their character which they can then level up by completing the storyline. Reaching level 50 unlocks access to tiered endgame dungeons and raids, at which point most further progress is tied to the character's gear score.

Development 
Lost Ark development began in 2011 under the codename Project T. The game uses Unreal Engine 3. It originally only supported DirectX 9 but was updated to also support DirectX 11 prior to the western release in 2022.

Release 
Lost Ark was fully released in South Korea on December 4, 2019, and in North American, South American, and European regions on February 11, 2022, with Amazon Games serving as the global publisher. Users that pre-purchased one of four founder's packs could play 3 days early on February 8, 2022. The game was initially unavailable in Belgium and the Netherlands due to the countries' stringent loot box regulations, with the latter later reversing its decision.

Within twenty-four hours of its release, Lost Ark became the second most played game on Steam.

Release schedules 
In 2021, there were plans between Smilegate and game publisher HappyTuk to launch Lost Ark in Taiwan. It was announced in 2023 that the release of Taiwanese servers has been delayed but not canceled.

Reception 

Lost Ark received "generally favorable" reviews according to review aggregator Metacritic.

PC Magazine praised Lost Arks combat, writing, "Abilities look good, sound sufficiently powerful, and feel great to use. You can’t help but feel like a combat god when you divekick a crowd, and blast fodder monsters into bloody chunks." Despite enjoying some of the minigames, Rock Paper Shotgun disliked the game's structure and felt, compared to other MMOs, Lost Ark had little to offer: "Some may relish the chores, the gradual progress of the EXP bar, and the allure of shiny loot rewards... Yet, there's nothing I've seen so far in the game's questing and progression that makes it stand out from the competition." PC Gamer liked the combat abilities, but criticized the story: "Lost Ark can be a captivating adventure, which makes it a shame that the main story is simply not that compelling. The central cast of characters are a largely one-dimensional carousel of exhaustingly noble heroes and villains." The Western release was also criticized for its high volume of bots.

Notes

References

External links 
  (in English, Spanish, German, and French)
  

2019 video games
Active massively multiplayer online games
Action role-playing video games
Massively multiplayer online role-playing games
Unreal Engine games
Video games developed in South Korea
Windows games
Windows-only games
Smilegate games